Warmer is the third studio album by American musician Jeff Tweedy, released on April 15, 2019 by dBpm Records. It is his second solo album of entirely new material, and was recorded at the same time as his previous album, Warm. Warmer was initially released on vinyl as a Record Store Day exclusive, and saw wider digital release on July 12, 2019.

Track listing

Personnel
Credits adapted from liner notes.

Musicians
 Jeff Tweedy – vocals, songwriting, instruments
 Spencer Tweedy – drums 
 Sammy Tweedy – photography

References

2019 albums
DBpm Records albums
Jeff Tweedy albums
Albums produced by Jeff Tweedy